Colegio San Agustin (Spanish for "St. Augustine School") in Santiago, Chile is an institution of learning specializing in elementary and secondary education founded in 1885.  It is a private school that belongs to the Order of St. Augustine or OSA.

Patron saint
The college is named after the 4th-century saint, St. Augustine of Hippo. Augustine is a key figure in the doctrinal development of Western Christianity and has been declared a "Doctor of the Church" by the Catholic Church. Augustine is often considered to be one of the theological fountainheads of the Protestant Reformation, because of his teachings on salvation and grace; Reformer Martin Luther was an Augustinian friar. Augustine was not a Biblical fundamentalist.

References

Catholic schools in Chile
Educational institutions established in 1865
Augustinian schools
Schools in Santiago Metropolitan Region
Private schools in Chile
1865 establishments in Chile